The Happy Hooker is a 1975 American biographical comedy film directed by Nicholas Sgarro and starring Lynn Redgrave. It was adapted from the best-selling memoir by Xaviera Hollander.

Plot
As prostitutes are arrested in New York, a flashback begins to the life of one of them, a Dutch secretary Xaviera Hollander who moved to New York in hopes of marrying her fiancé Carl, whom she met whilst visiting her sister in South Africa.

Observing how Carl does not help her take her bags off the airplane and his increasingly long morning routine and primping, Xaviera grows concerned he is not the man she thought he was. Her suspicions are confirmed when his mother insults her over dinner. Xaviera offers him a choice of her or his mother and he picks his mother.

Xaviera finds work at the Dutch Embassy as a translator and secretary. She is asked on a date by Frenchman Yves and quickly falls in love with him and his extravagant lifestyle, as Yves has made a small fortune as a consultant for large corporations and even small countries.

Yves announces that he must leave as he has been summoned by the king of a Middle Eastern country. Xaviera breaks down crying. He hands her a large envelope containing cash. Although it makes her feel like a prostitute, she realizes quickly that this may be her calling in life because she loves sex and money. She starts meeting up with Yves' friends.

Xaviera prospers as a prostitute until she is shaken down by a corrupt police officer who takes her money and tries to rape her. Instead of paying him off, she goes to work at a local bordello with a madam who offers her a 50/50 split. Xaviera decides that she can do better on her own, so she leaves to open her own bordello ten blocks away. After a while, she is the most successful madam in New York City and buys out her former madam's business as well.

All is well until the corrupt cop from earlier in the film sees her and instigates a raid, sending her to jail. Xaviera's attorney bails her out of jail and sets her up with a friend of his who is coming in from Montreal.

Principal cast

Critical reception
Vincent Canby of The New York Times enjoyed the film: 

On the other hand, Roger Ebert of the Chicago Sun-Times gave it one star out of four and wrote:

See also
 List of American films of 1975
 The Happy Hooker Goes to Washington (1977)
 The Happy Hooker Goes Hollywood (1980)

References

External links
 
 

1975 films
American biographical films
American comedy films
1970s English-language films
Films about prostitution in the United States
Comedy films based on actual events
Films based on memoirs
Films set in New York City
Films shot in New York City
Golan-Globus films
Cultural depictions of Xaviera Hollander
1970s American films